Patrick Thomas Leal (born February 21, 2003) is an American professional soccer player who plays as a midfielder for Italian  team Venezia. Earlier, he played for Sporting CP.

Career 
He spent one year with the New England Revolution youth academy. He has secured 7 goals in 25 appearances for the New England Revolution's under-14 team during the 2016-17 season. Leal was with Belenenses SAD for a year before signing with Sporting in October 2018.

In September 2019, Patrick signed a five-year professional contract with Sporting. He trained mainly with Sporting's youth teams. He assisted twice in Sporting under-17's 4-0 victory over Caldas. He holds a European Union passport, making him eligible to play for any European team. He currently plays for Venezia F.C. in Italy. Patrick earned a call-up to the United States under-14 team in 2017.

Personal life 
He is originally from Newton, Massachusetts. Patrick resides in Venice, Italy. His twin brother, Matthew Leal is also a soccer player who represents Casa Pia AC. He is of Portuguese descent through his father, and holds a Portuguese passport.

References 

2003 births
American soccer players
American people of Portuguese descent
Association football midfielders
Living people
Soccer players from Massachusetts
Serie A players
Venezia F.C. players
C.F. Os Belenenses players